Gras may refer to:

People 
 Basile Gras (1836–1901), French firearm designer
 Enrico Gras (1919–1981), Italian filmmaker
 Felix Gras (1844–1901), Provençal poet and novelist
 Laurent Gras (disambiguation)
 N. S. B. Gras (1884–1956), Canadian-American economist
 Patricia Gras (born 1960), American journalist
 Paweł Graś (born 1964), Polish politician

Places 
 Gras, Ardèche, a commune in France
 Les Gras, a commune in the Doubs department, France

Other uses 
 The Gras rifle: the Fusil Gras mle 1874, was a French service rifle that came into service in 1874, and some countries still used as late as 1940.
 Generally recognized as safe, a designation of the American Food and Drug Administration
 Graisse, a French wine grape variety
 Gras conjecture, in algebraic number theory

See also 
 GRA (disambiguation)
 Grass (disambiguation)